Baylon is a surname. Notable people with the surname include:

 Ernst Baylon (1903–?), Austrian fencer
 Jair Baylón (born 1989), Peruvian footballer
 John Baylon (born 1965), Filipino judoka
 Julio Baylón (1950–2004), Peruvian footballer
 Luren Baylon (born 1977), Peruvian volleyball player
 Nelly Baylon (1937–1950s), Filipino actress
 Norma Baylon (born 1942), Argentinian tennis player
 Oscar Baylón Chacón (1929–2020), Mexican politician
 Paschal Baylón (1540–1592), Spanish friar
 Terence Baylon (born 1984), Filipino actor and model